Chorale Roanne Basket is a professional basketball club that is based in Roanne, France.  The club plays in the first division LNB Pro A.  Their home arena is Halle André Vacheresse. The club was founded in 1937 and the team's colors are blue and white.

History
In Chorale's history, the team won two national titles; in 1959 and most recent in 2007. The teams honour list also includes a La Semaine des As Cup (in 2007) and multiple European campaigns. In the 2007–08 season, the club even played in the top level Euroleague. In the 2013–14 season, the club was relegated to the LNB Pro B.

In the 2018–19 season, Roanne won the Pro B championship and promoted back to the Pro A after a five-year absence.

Current roster

Season by season

Achievements
French Championship 
Champions (2): 1958–59, 2006–07
French Cup
Runner-up (1): 1963–64
La Semaine des As Cup
Winners (1): 2007
LNB Pro B Leaders Cup
Winners (2): 2017, 2019

Players

Individual awards
Pro A Foreign MVP
Dewarick Spencer – 2007
Marc Salyers – 2008

Notable players

Head coaches

 2011-14 :  Luka Pavićević
 2000-11 :  Jean-Denys Choulet
 1998-00 :  Mike Gonsalves
 1996-98 :  Patrick Macazaga
 1993-96 :  Gilles Versier
 1988-93 :  Alain Thinet
 1985-88 :  André Jacquemot
 1984-85 :  Yvon Leca
 1983-84 :  Alain Monestier
 1982-83 :  Jacky Odin
 1980-82 :  Jean-Paul Pupunat
 1977-80 :  André Vacheresse
 1975-77 :  Jeff Dubreuil
 1974-75 :  Dick Smith
 1972-74 :  Ludvick Luttna
 1971-72 :  Gérard Sturla
 1970-71 :  Lucien Piegad
 1961-69 :  Maurice Marcelot
 1945-61 :  André Vacheresse

References

External links

 Official website

Roanne
Sport in Roanne
Basketball teams established in 1937
1937 establishments in France